Cavan Spencer Kendall McCarthy (22 May 1942 – 29 October 1999) was a British actor.

Life
Kendall was born in Edinburgh, Scotland. His father was the son of music hall comedian and actress Marie Kendall. Through his father, Kendall was also a half-brother of actress Kay Kendall.

He died of cancer in Gloucestershire at the age of 57.

Career
Amongst his theatre work, Kendall appeared opposite Sarah Miles in the original West End production of Vivat! Vivat Regina! at the Piccadilly Theatre, and in Justice is a Woman at the Vaudeville (as well as its subsequent TV version opposite Margaret Lockwood). He acted in many television series, including the BBC's 1957 version of The Railway Children, and the Doctor Who story The Myth Makers in the role of Achilles. He appeared in the films Here We Go Round the Mulberry Bush (1968), Eureka (1983), The Clandestine Marriage (1999) and Sexy Beast (2000). Kendall died shortly after the filming of Sexy Beast and did not see the critically acclaimed film which has become a cult classic.

References

External links 

1942 births
1999 deaths
Male actors from London
Deaths from cancer in England
English male stage actors
English male film actors
English male television actors
People from Clapham
20th-century English male actors